İnciraltı is a neighborhood in İzmir, Turkey.

Geography
İnciraltı is a part of Balçova second level municipality of Greater İzmir. It is a coastal neighborhood facing the gulf of İzmir to the north. Between these two points there is also a fishery. The forest area to the north of the neighborhood is named İnciraltı forest.

History
In the past İnciraltı was the most important public beach and picnic area of İzmir.  In weekends, ferries used to transport İzmir citizens to İnciraltı. It was also potentially one of the development areas of İzmir. But after the area around İnciraltı was declared an Archaeological site, no new housing was permitted.

İnciraltı now
In addition to old houses there are  six shopping malls,  some hotels and some university buildings which were built out of the restricted area. İnciraltı Sea Museum is actually a boat. Besides İzmir applied for Expo 2020 and İnciraltı is the candidate for the EXPO 2020 area.

References

İzmir
Balçova
Beaches of Turkey